

Air France Flight 1611 (AF1611) was a Sud Aviation SE-210 Caravelle III en route from Ajaccio, in the island of Corsica, to Nice, France, on 11 September 1968 when it crashed into the Mediterranean Sea off Nice, killing all 95 on board. According to the official report, the crash was non-survivable. The Ajaccio-Nice Caravelle crash is the deadliest aviation incident in the Mediterranean Sea to date. However for unknown reasons, all documents & photos related to the accident have been kept classified.

The probable cause was attributed to a fire of uncertain origin which originated in the rear of the cabin. There was early speculation that the plane was hit by a surface-to-air missile, since there is a firing area not far from the crash site. Although the hypothesis was officially discarded by the inquiry board, many victims' relatives still have doubts and have asked to have access to classified documents about the event.

Official report from French transport ministry
In December 1972, the inquiry board of the French ministry of transportation published its official report. The report surmised that the loss of the aircraft had been caused by a fire in the passenger toilet caused either by a defective water heater or a cigarette discarded in a waste bin. This rejected the suggestion of any missile strike, basing its findings on the aircraft's survival time after the pilot's initial report to air traffic control of a fire on board, the examination of the wreckage recovered from the seabed, knowledge of a similar accidental fire in another Sud Aviation Caravelle, and the declaration by the French defence ministry that there were no surface ships in the area capable of launching missiles. 

Among the dead was French general René Cogny.

Missile theory 
On 10 May 2011, Michel Laty, a former army typist, alleged on French television channel TF1 that he saw a report indicating a missile, misfired by the French army during a weapon test, in fact caused the crash.

A 2019 article in The Guardian newspaper reported that, after the crash, documents and photographs about it disappeared. The 11 September page in the log book for Le Suffren, a French Navy missile frigate in the area, was torn out. The aircraft's black box flight recorder was said to have been damaged, with the recording of flight AF1611 unreadable, although earlier flights were recorded. Wreckage recovered was seized by France's military.  An investigation was started in 2011 by gendarmes, and in September 2019 the theory that a fire had started in a toilet was disproved. A family member of one of those killed said "The investigating judge has said he is practically certain to almost 100% that the plane was hit by a missile. Now we are waiting". French president Emmanuel Macron wrote to a victim's family, saying that he hoped the affair would be declassified, and that he had asked the armed forces minister to begin the process of releasing documents related to the crash.

References

External links
 "Arthur O'Connor's Last Flight"—Factual, 14 November 2007; BBC Radio 4 programme
 
 The Other 9/11 —More details about this crash, subsequent investigation, and the mysteries that surround it

Airliner accidents and incidents caused by in-flight fires
Aviation accidents and incidents in 1968
Aviation accidents and incidents in France
Aviation accidents and incidents in the Mediterranean Sea
1611
1968 in France
Accidents and incidents involving the Sud Aviation Caravelle
Conspiracy theories involving aviation incidents
September 1968 events in Europe
1968 disasters in France